Storm naming may refer to:
 Tropical cyclone naming
 Extratropical cyclone#Terminology
 Winter storm naming in the United Kingdom and Ireland
 Winter storm naming in the United States